Highbridge (also spelled High Bridge) is an unincorporated community located in the town of Ashland, Ashland County, Wisconsin, United States. Highbridge has a post office with ZIP code 54846. Bus service to the community is provided by Bay Area Rural Transit.

Climate
The climate is described as Humid Continental by the Köppen Climate System, abbreviated as Dfb.

Images

References

Unincorporated communities in Ashland County, Wisconsin
Unincorporated communities in Wisconsin